Tilloclytus bruneri is a species of longhorn beetle in the Cerambycinae subfamily. It was described by Fisher in 1932. It is known from Cuba.

References

Anaglyptini
Beetles described in 1932
Endemic fauna of Cuba